Poropuntius normani is a species of ray-finned fish in the genus Poropuntius which occurs in hill streams and near waterfalls in the upland reaches of river drainages in eastern Thailand, Western Cambodia, the Kong River in Laos and in north central Vietnam. It is common and although threatened by habitat destruction through deforestation it is assessed as Least Concern by the IUCN. It is sometimes eaten but is not a specific target of fisheries and is sometimes turns up in the aquarium trade.

References 

normani
Fish described in 1931